is a Japanese footballer who plays for Ehime FC.

Club statistics
Updated to end of 2018 season.

1Includes Japanese Super Cup and J2 playoffs.

References

External links

Profile at Ehime FC

1988 births
Living people
University of Teacher Education Fukuoka alumni
Association football people from Miyazaki Prefecture
Japanese footballers
J1 League players
J2 League players
Sanfrecce Hiroshima players
Tochigi SC players
Ehime FC players
Association football defenders